Aphomia opticogramma is a species of snout moth in the genus Aphomia. It was described by Edward Meyrick in 1935 and is known from Lebanon.

References

Moths described in 1935
Tirathabini
Moths of the Middle East